In mathematics, a bidiagonal matrix is a banded matrix with non-zero entries along the main diagonal and either the diagonal above or the diagonal below. This means there are exactly two non-zero diagonals in the matrix.

When the diagonal above the main diagonal has the non-zero entries the matrix is upper bidiagonal.  When the diagonal below the main diagonal has the non-zero entries the matrix is lower bidiagonal.

For example, the following matrix is upper bidiagonal:

and the following matrix is lower bidiagonal:

Usage
One variant of the QR algorithm starts with reducing a general matrix into a bidiagonal one,
and the singular value decomposition (SVD) uses this method as well.

Bidiagonalization

Bidiagonalization allows guaranteed accuracy when using floating-point arithmetic to compute singular values.

See also
 List of matrices
 LAPACK
 Hessenberg form – The Hessenberg form is similar, but has more non-zero diagonal lines than 2.

References
 Stewart, G. W. (2001) Matrix Algorithms, Volume II: Eigensystems. Society for Industrial and Applied Mathematics. .

External links
 High performance algorithms for reduction to condensed (Hessenberg, tridiagonal, bidiagonal) form

Linear algebra
Sparse matrices